Lake Ellsworth Addition is a census-designated place (CDP) in Comanche County, Oklahoma, United States. It was first listed as a CDP prior to the 2020 census.

The CDP is in northern Comanche County, to the northeast of Lake Ellsworth, an impoundment on East Cache Creek, a south-flowing tributary of the Red River. It sits just north of the lake's Tony Creek inlet.

Demographics

References 

Census-designated places in Comanche County, Oklahoma
Census-designated places in Oklahoma